Brisbin is a borough in Clearfield County, Pennsylvania, United States. The population was 422 at the 2020 census.

Geography
It is nearly surrounded by Woodward Township, though Decatur Township partially borders it on the east. The borough of Houtzdale is directly to the south.

Gose Run flows through the borough, leading east to Beaver Run, which in turn flows east to Moshannon Creek, a tributary of the West Branch Susquehanna River.

Demographics

As of the census of 2000, there were 413 people, 166 households, and 124 families residing in the borough. The population density was 655.2 people per square mile (253.1/km2). There were 181 housing units at an average density of 287.1 per square mile (110.9/km2). The racial makeup of the borough was 98.79% White, 0.24% African American, 0.24% from other races, and 0.73% from two or more races. Hispanic or Latino of any race were 0.24% of the population.

There were 166 households, out of which 34.3% had children under the age of 18 living with them, 60.2% were married couples living together, 12.0% had a female householder with no husband present, and 24.7% were non-families. 22.3% of all households were made up of individuals, and 10.2% had someone living alone who was 65 years of age or older. The average household size was 2.49 and the average family size was 2.91.

In the borough the population was spread out, with 23.5% under the age of 18, 5.3% from 18 to 24, 31.2% from 25 to 44, 24.5% from 45 to 64, and 15.5% who were 65 years of age or older. The median age was 38 years. For every 100 females there were 88.6 males. For every 100 females age 18 and over, there were 81.6 males.

The median income for a household in the borough was $30,250, and the median income for a family was $35,875. Males had a median income of $28,750 versus $21,250 for females. The per capita income for the borough was $13,805. About 16.0% of families and 18.8% of the population were below the poverty line, including 30.5% of those under age 18 and 7.5% of those age 65 or over.

References

Boroughs in Clearfield County, Pennsylvania
1883 establishments in Pennsylvania